Gerðuberg (also transcribed Gerduberg) is a cliff of dolerite, a coarse-grained basalt rock, located on western peninsula Snæfellsnes and on the western edge of the Hnappadalur  valley, 46 km in the north of the town of Borgarnes and 115 km to Reykjavík.

Gerðuberg was formed from flowing basaltic lava, cooled by the sea, solidified in very evenly running columns. These are between 1 and 1.5 m wide and 7 to 14 m high.

Near Gerðuberg 
 Volcanic cone Eldborg
 a water source
 Löngufjörur  beach
 settlement Borg á Mýrum

References

See also 

 List of columnar basalts in Iceland

Columnar basalts in Iceland
Snæfellsnes